is a train station on the Minobu Line of Central Japan Railway Company (JR Central) located in the town of Shōwa, Nakakoma District, Yamanashi Prefecture, Japan. Although officially in the town of Shōwa, the border with the city of  Kōfu runs through the middle of the station.

Lines
Kokubo Station is served by the Minobu Line and is located 81.2 kilometers from the southern terminus of the line at Fuji Station.

Layout
Kokubo Station has one island platform connected to the station building by a level crossing. The station is unattended.

Platforms

Adjacent stations

History
Kokubo Station was opened on March 30, 1928 as a passenger station on the Fuji-Minobu Line. The line came under control of the Japanese Government Railways on May 1, 1941. The JGR became the JNR (Japan National Railway) after World War II. The station has been unattended since June 1983. Along with the division and privatization of JNR on April 1, 1987, the station came under the control of the Central Japan Railway Company..

Surrounding area
 Kokubo Post Office

See also
 List of railway stations in Japan

External links

  Minobu Line station information  	

Railway stations in Japan opened in 1928
Railway stations in Yamanashi Prefecture
Minobu Line
Shōwa, Yamanashi